The 1933 Wyoming Cowboys football team was an American football team that represented the University of Wyoming in the Rocky Mountain Conference (RMC) during the 1933 college football season.  In their first season under head coach Willard Witte, the Cowboys compiled a 2–6–1 record (1–6–1 against conference opponents), finished in 11th place out of 12 teams in the RMC, and were outscored by a total of 114 to 54.

Schedule

References

Wyoming
Wyoming Cowboys football seasons
Wyoming Cowboys football